Michel François (born 1956, Saint-Trond, Belgium) is a Belgian artist. He lives and works in Brussels, Belgium.

His art explores a variety of media including installation, video, sculpture and photography.

Solo exhibitions
2018
 Galerie Mezzanin, Geneva, Switzerland 
 Carlier Gebauer, Berlin, Germany 
 Alfonso Artiaco, Naples, Italy 
2017
 Xavier Hufkens, Brussels, Belgium 
2016
 Nineteen thousand posters. 1994-2016, Frac île de france, Le Château, Rentilly, France 
 Pièce à conviction, Middelheim Museum, Antwerpen, Belgium 
2014
 Thomas Dane Gallery, London, UK 
 Ciel Ouvert, Kamel Mennour, Paris, France 
2013
 Pieces of Evidence, carlier | gebauer, Berlin, Germany
 Une Exposition Universelle (section documentaire), Biennale d´Ottignies-Louvain-la-Neuve, Ottignies-Louvain-la-Neuve, Belgium
2012
 Michel François : Le Trait commun, Cabinet des dessins Jean Bonna, École nationale supérieure des Beaux-Arts de Paris.
 Michel François : Pièces à conviction, Centre Régional d’Art Contemporain, Sète.
 Michel François : Pièces à conviction, Xavier Hufkens, Brussels, Belgium
 Michel François : Photographe, Rue Visconti, Paris
2011	
 45000 affiches 1984 - 2011, MAC’s, Grand-Hornu, Belgium
 22500 affiches 1994 - 2011, Centre de Création Contemporaine, Tours, France
 Independent, New York City
 Exposition personnelle Galerie Kamel Mennour, Paris
2010	
 Plans d’évasion, Institut d’art Contemporain Villeurbanne
 Pavilion Interface, Bortolami, New York
2009	
 SMAK, Ghent, Belgium
 Xavier Hufkens, Brussels, Belgium
 Galleria S.AL.E.S., Rome, Italy
 Hespérides I, Musée des Beaux-Arts, Lausanne, Switzerland
2008	
 Bortolami, New York
 MC Kunst, Los Angeles
 Thomas Dane, London, United Kingdom
2007	
 Editions and Multiples, 1979–2007, Gallery Lumen Travo, Amsterdam, NL
2006	
 Sculptures, Carlier Gebauer, Berlin, Germany
 Theater of Operations, Bortolami Dayan, New York, NY
2005	
 Galerie Xavier Hufkens, Brussels, Belgium (with Richard Venlet)
 35 Posters on Display, CCStrombeek, Belgium
 Théâtre des opérations, Maison de la culture d’Amiens, France
 FRAC-collection Aquitaine, France
 FRAC Haute-Normandie, France
2004	
 Théâtre des opérations, Centre Photographique d’Ile-de-France
 Théâtre des opérations, Art Pace Foundation, San Antonio, Texas
 Villa delle Rose, Bologna, Italy
 Domaine de Kerguéhennec, Bignan, France
 Déjà-vu, De Pont Museum of Contemporary Art, Tilburg, Netherlands
 Déjà-vu, Carlier Gebauer, Berlin, Germany
 Art Unlimited, Basel Art Fair, Switzerland
2003	
 Michel François, Espace VOX, Montreal, Canada
 Déjà-vu, CCA Kitakyushu, Japan
 Hallu, Lumen Travo, Amsterdam
 Michel François, Westfälischer Kunstverein Münster, Munster, Germany
2002	
 Salon Intermédiaire, Centre Georges Pompidou, Paris
 Autoportrait contre nature, Carlier Gebauer, Berlin
 680.000 Bailleurs, Centre de la Photographie, Geneva
 Michel François Photoshow, Ursula Blickle Foundation,  Kraichtal, Germany	
 Editions, Rétrospective, Librairie Florence Loewy, Paris
 Michel François: Dessins-Multiples, CIAP, Hasselt, Belgium
 Photoshow, Ursula-Blickle-Stiftung, Kraichtal, Germany
2001	
 Autoportrait Contre Nature, Argos, Brussels
 Bureau Encore Augmenté, BLAC, Brussels
 Psycho Jardin, Fondation Miró, Barcelona
 Ensemble, with Meshac Gaba, Galerie Lumen Travo, Amsterdam
 Curt Marcus Gallery, New York
2000	
 La Plante en nous, Kunsthalle Bern, Bern, CH
 La Plante en nous, Haus der Kunst, Munich
1999	
 Bureau Augmenté, Galerie Gebauer, Berlin
 Bureau Augmenté, Galerie Jennifer Flay, Paris
 L’Exposition, la Boutique et le Bureau, Palais des Beaux-Arts de Charleroi, Belgium
 Horror vacui, Belgian Pavilion, 48e Venezia Biennale, with Ann Veronica Janssens
 Un Centre culturel mit sens dessus dessous, Centre Culturel, St Truiden,
 FARCO, Madrid, with Galerie Gebauer
 Hyperspace, Marie-Puck Broodthaers, Brussels
1998	
 A flux tendu, Moulin Albigeois, Cimaise et Portique, Contemporary Art Center of Albi
1997	
 Affichage urbain, Cimaise et Portique, Albi
 Projet avec les détenus du TBS Dekijvelanden, Rotterdam
 Mest, Brannetels en paardenbloemen, Witte De With, Rotterdam
 Abonos, ortigas y dientes de Leon, Tecla Sala, Barcelona
1996	
 Curt Marcus Gallery, New York
 Affichage urbain, EDA Dunkerque
 Le Monde et les Bras. Une résidence terrestre, FRAC Limousin, Limoges
 Lumen Travo, Amsterdam
1995	
 Galerie Marie-Pück Broodthaers, Brussels
 Galerie Ursula Walbröl, Düsseldorf
 Galerie Gebauer + Günther, Berlin	
 Galerie Jennifer Flay, Paris
1994	
 Curt Marcus Gallery, New York
1993	
 Galerie Gebauer + Günther, Berlin
1992	
 Michel Francois, Palais des Beaux Arts, Brussels
1991	
 Galerie Lumen Travo, Amsterdam
 Vereniging voor het Museum van Hedendaagse Kunst, Gent
1990	
 Galerie Michel Vidal, Paris
 Galerie des Beaux-Arts, Brussels
1989	
 Galerie Camille von Scholz, Brussels
 Het latijnse noorden in vier scenes, Musée d´Hasselt (with Kandilaptis, Janssens, Muyle)
1988	
 Vereniging voor het Museum van Hedendaagse Kunst, Gent
 Galerie Brachot, Brussels
 Musée d´Art Moderne, Brussels

Group exhibitions 
2014
 lille3000, Secret Passions. Private Flemish Collections, Lille

2013
 Die Wahrscheinlichkeit, dass nichts passiert,  carlier | gebauer, Berlin, Germany
 Imminent Sounds - Falls and crossings, Taipei Fine Arts Museum, Taipei, Taiwan
 All this here, tout est là, Pavillon du carré Baudouin, Paris, France
 Play and Replay, Biennale de la photographie de Mulhouse, Mulhouse, France
 Vues d’en haut, Centre Pompidou-Metz, Metz, France
 ArtZuid 2013, Amsterdam, the Netherlands
 Des gestes de la pensée, La Verrière, fondation Hermes, Bruxelles, Belgium
 The independent, Bortolami Galery, New York, NY, USA
 Turbulences II, Fondation Boghossian, Bruxelles, Belgium
2012
 Lux Perpetua, Galerie Kamel Mennour, Paris, France
2011	
 WANDER, Labyrinine Variations, Centre Pompidou-Metz, France, curated by Hélène Guenin and Guillaume Désanges
 Everything you can imagine is real, the Xavier Hufkens Gallery, Brussels, Belgium
 Open frame, Crac de Sète, France
2009	
 The Practice of Everyday Life, Fundación/Colección Jumex, Mexico, curated by Frédéric Bonnet
2008	
 The Practice of Everyday Life, Museo Nacional de Arte, Mexico City, curated by Frédéric Bonnet
2007  	
 Passage du Temps – Collection François Pinault, Tri Postal, Lille, France
 Lille 3000, Lille, France
 Intocable (el ideal de la transparencia), Patio Herreriano, Valladolid, Spain
 La Ricarda, «Studio», Kunstenfestival des Arts, Brussels, Belgium (A)
 La Ricarda, Laboratoire Artistique International du Tarn, Albi, France
2006	
 Intouchable, l’architecture de verre & l’idéal transparence, Villa Arson, Nice (cat)
 Open Ended, Gallery Thomas Dane, London
 Faire Signe, La Criée, centre d’art contemporain, Rennes, France (A)
 Voisins officiels, Musée d’Art Moderne de Lille, France
 Belgique visionnaire, Palais des Beaux Arts, Bruxelles, Belgium
2005	
 a guest+a host =a ghost, Hedge House, Limburg, NL
 Œuvres politiques et politiques de l’œuvre, Institut Français de Casablanca, Marocco
 Le jeune, le vivace,  le bel aujourd’hui (épisode 2/3), Maison Populaire de Montreuil
 Voisins officiels, Musée d’Art Moderne de Lille, France
 Belgique visionnaire, Beaux Arts de Bruxelles
 Le jeune, le vivace et le bel aujourd’hui (épisode 1/3), Maison Populaire de Montreuil
2004	
 Amicalement Vôtre, Musée des Beaux Arts de Tourcoing, Lille, France
 Aan de hand van Gagarin, collectiepresentatie X, Muhka, Antwerp, Belgium
 Ralentir vite, le Plateau/Frac Ile de France, Paris, France
 Figures de l’acteur, Jeu de Paume, Hôtel de Sully, Paris, France
2004	
 As A House That Moves, Fri-Art, Fribourg, CH
 Ipermercati dell’Arte, Santa Maria della Scala, Siena, Italia
 L’ombre du temps, Jeu de Paume, Paris
 Eblouissement, Jeu de Paume, Paris
 Les Afriques, Espace 251 Nord - Lille 2004, France
 You said erotic, Marijke Schreurs, Bruxelles, Belgium
 Storage/l’entrepôt du Musée, Collection de la Province du Hainaut, Charleroi, France
2003	
 Outlook, International Art Exhibition, Athens, Greece
 As A House That Moves, Kunsthalle Freibourg, Switzerland
 Wiels, Centre des Arts Contemporains, Brussels, Belgium
 Storage and Display, Programa Art Center, Mexico
 Plasticiens en mouvement, De Markten, Brussels, Belgium
 Particules élémentaires, Atelier 340 Museum, Brussels, Belgium	
 Coconutour, Centre Régional d’Art Contemporain, Sète, France
 Le Colloque des Chiens, Centre Wallonie-Bruxelles, Paris, France
 Tattoo, exhibition Artwalk Amsterdam, Nederlands
 Dessins, La lettre volée, Brussels, Belgium
 Gelijk het leven is, S.M.A.K, Gent, Belgium
 Fables d’identité, Centre national de la photographie, Paris, France
 Stop & Go, Frac-Nord Pas de Calais, France
 Le Paysage vu de profil, Les Chiroux, Liege, Belgium
 Kuntsammlung IKOB, Eupen, Belgium
 Collection de la Communauté Française de Belgique, Eupen, Belgium
2002	
 L’Herbier et le Nuage, Musée des Arts Contemporains, Le Hornu, Belgium
 Sunday Afternoon, 303 Gallery, New York
 Nature Humaine, Les Brasseurs, Liège
 Recent Video from Belgium, Philadelphia Museum of Art
 Vivement 2002, Mamco, Genève, CH
 100 ans de la Ligue des Droits de l’Homme, Palais de Justice, Brussels, Belgium
 Self / In Material Conscience, Fondazione Sandretto Re Rebaudengo, Guarene, Italy
 Multiples, Galerie Art&com, Brussels, Belgium
 Octopus, Brugge 2002, Bruges
2001	
 Ici et Maintenant, Espace 251 Nord, Brussels, Belgium
 Ensemble, Lumen Travo, Amsterdam
 Locus Focus, Somsbeek, Arnhem
 Atelier, Dexia, Brussels
 Instabilités, St. Luc, Brussels
 Milano Europa 2001, Italy
 AZERTY, Centre Pompidou, Paris
 Voici, Palais des Beaux Arts, Brussels
 Soyez Réalistes, Demandez l’Impossible, Galerie Jennifer Flay, Paris
 Le Mois de la Photo, Montréal, Canada
 Das Versprechen der Fotografie, Kunsthalle Frankfurt, Germany
2000	
 Sensitive, Printemps de Cahors, France
 La Conscience du Monde, Biennale de Louvain la Neuve, B
 MA, collaboration with the scenographer Pierre Droulers
 Leaving the Island, First Bienal of Pusan, Korea
 The Box Project, MOI, London
 The Rain Project, Bamako
 Continent, Bruxelles 2000
 Une autre dimension, Hyper Space Bruxelles
 Les chantiers du musée, Mac´s, Grand Hornu, Bruxelles
 Pièces à Convinction, Espace 251 Nord, Bruxelles
 Les premiers les derniers, Centre Wallonie Bruxelles
 Un chant d’etoiles, Opéra de la Monnaie, Bruxelles
 Box Project, Museum of Installation, London
1999	
 Galerie Asbaek, Copenhagen
 Laboratorium, Antwerpen
 Held and let go, CCAC, Oakland, USA
1998	
 Aanwisten, Middelheim, Antwerpen
 Cet été-là, Centre Régional d´Art Contemporain du Languedoc Roussillon, Sète 	
 Tapta, Musée Ixelles, Machine à Eau, Mons / Musée d’Art Moderne et Contemporain, Liège
 “Fisching for Shapes, ” Künstlerhaus Bethanien, Berlin
 Curt Marcus Gallery, New York
 L´Empreinte, Centre Georges Pompidou, Paris
 Beeld in park, Affichage urbain, Brussels 	
 Flevoland gevoel, une image published in the newspaper
1997	
 Skindeep, Galerie Jennifer Flay, Paris
 Densité, Domaine de Kerguéhennec, France
 Who loves Brussels?, Canal 20, Encore... Bruxelles, Belgium
1996	
 Fertile Ground, Social Cultureel Centrum, ‘T Eizenveld, Antwerpen
 Espace 251 Nord, Liège
 Prospect 96, Kunstverein, Frankfurt
 Karl Blossfeldt, Michel Francois, Galerie Rodolphe Janssen, Brussels
 Wordt Vervolgd, Lumen Travo, Amsterdam
 Nach Weimar, Weimar
 Galerie Fortlaan, Gent
 Istanbul Biennale
1995	
 Ie Biennale de Johannesburg
 La Valise du Célibataire, Gare de Maastricht
 Belgisches Haus Köln, Cologne
 Westchor  Ostportal, Marstall, Berlin
 Photographies, Galerie Rodolphe Janssen, Brussels
 Mountain-Foutain, scénographie pour le chorégraphe Pierre Droulers, Galerie Rodolphe Janssen, Brussels
 Sculpture as Object, Curt Marcus Galery, New York
 Infections, Wolfslaar Park, Breda
 A Night at the Show, Fields, Zurich
 Belgio, ex Lanificio Bona Carignano, Torino
 Chroniques new-yorkaise, Agnès b., New-York
 Opname, Ignatlus Ziekenhuis, Breda
1994
 Galerie Lumen Travo, Amsterdam, (mit Lewandowski)
 Beeld Buiten, Tielt
 Beeld Beeld, Museum Van Hedendaagse Kunst,
 Gent Ecole des Beaux Arts de St. Etienne XXII. São Paulo Biennale, São Paulo
1994	
 De Maat der Dingen, Musée Helmond, Helmond
 IK+De Ander, Amsterdam
 A Mascara, A Muller, A Morte, Culturgest, Lisboa
 Art Hotel, Amsterdam
1993	
 L´Art en Belgique depuis 1980, Musée d´Art Moderne, Brussels
 Chambres d´hôtels, Québec
 Acquisitions, Musée de Gand
 Autoportraits Contemporains, Elac, Lyon
 L’Objet Théorique, Domaine de Kerguéhennec, France
 Galerie Lumen Travo, Amsterdam
 Galerie Jenifer Flay, Paris
 Kunst in Zoersel, Zoersel
 Galerie Rodolphe Janssens, Brussels
 Le Jardin de la Vierge, Old England, Espace 251 Nord, Brussels
 L´Architecture de Jardin au 20ème siécle, Fondation pour l´Architecture, Brussels
 La Tentation de l’Image, Fondation Gulbenkian, Espace 251 Nord, Lisbon
 Art in Belgium, Hong Kong
1992	
 Belien zu Gast, Galerie Schröder, Monchengladbach, Germany
 Selectie Belgische Kunstenaars voor Documenta IX, Musée DHondt Dhaenens, Deurle
 Dokumenta IX, Kassel, Germany
 Galerie Gebauer + Günther, Berlin, Germany
 Arti en Amicitae, Amsterdam, Netherlands
1991	
 Les Voies de la Culture Européenne, Narodna Gallery, Bratislava / Hôtel de Ville,
 BrusselsKunstwerke, Berlin, Germany
 1951-1991: Images d’une époque, Palais des Beaux Arts, Brussels, Belgium
1991	
 Un Détail Immense, Palais des Beaux Arts, Charleroi, Belgium
 De Collectie Alsnoch, Provinciaal Museum, Hasselt, Belgium
 Zeger Rijers, “Multiples,” Rotterdam, Netherlands
 Door de Herhaling van de dromen naar de realiteit, Galerie Grita Insarn, Vienna, Austria
 Résonnances Contemporaines en Communauté Francaise, Centre d’Art Contemporain, Brussels, Belgium
 Basserode, Janssens, Francois, Vergara, Galerie des Beaux-Arts, Brussels, Belgium
 Dynamiques Contemporaines, Beaunord, Paris, France
1990	
 Taal en Geometrie, Stedelijk Museum, Amsterdam, Netherlands
1989	
 Galerie Michel Vidal, Paris, France
 Incidents de Parcours, Palais des Beaux-Arts, Brussels, Belgium
 De Integral, Atelier Steel, Bruges, Belgium
 Anamnèse, Galerie Métropole, Brussels, Belgium
 De Rozeboomkamer, Diepenheim, Netherlands
 Transatlantique, Le Botanique, Brussels, Belgium
 Le Merveilleux et la périphérie, Espace 251 Nord, Liège
1988
 Zeno X Galerie, Antwerp, Belgium
 5 artistes belges, Sala Amadis, Madrid, Spain
 De Collectie, Museum van Hedendaagse Kust, Antwerp, Belgium
 Casa Frolo, Espace 251 Nord, Venice, Italy
 De l’animal et du végétal, Van Reekum Museum, Apeldoorn, Netherlands
 Galerie Adrien Maeght, Montrouge, France
 Etats Limites, archives des passions, Espace 251 Nord, Liege, Belgium

Bibliography
Theys, Hans, "Michel  François: Carnet d’expositions 1999-2002,” published by Ursula-Blickle-Stiftung 
Kraichtal, Westfälischer Kunstverein Münster, Galleria d’Arte Moderna Bologna, 2002.
François, Michel, “La Plante en Nous/Die Pflanze in Uns,” published by Haus der Kunst, Munich, 2000.
François, Michel, “En Même temps,” published by Bibliothèque Royale de Belgique, 1998.
François, Michel, “Michel François,” published by la Societe des Expositions du Palais des Beaux-Arts de Bruxelles, 1993.
François, Michel, “Où Je Suis, Vu Du Ciel,” published by Espace 251 Nord a.s.b.l. (Liege)/Ante Post a.s.b.l (Bruxelles), 1999.

References

External links
Bortolami Gallery, New York
Art Daily
Xavier Hufkens
Kamel Mennour
carlier | gebauer
New York Times Review
Art Slant Review
Michel Francois at Xavier Hufkens, Brussels

1956 births
Belgian painters
People from Sint-Truiden
Living people